This is a timeline of voting rights in the United States. The timeline highlights milestones when groups of people in the United States gained voting rights, and also documents aspects of disenfranchisement in the country.

18th century

1780s
1789
The Constitution of the United States grants the states the power to set voting requirements. Generally, states limited this right to property-owning or tax-paying white males (about 6% of the population). However, some states allowed also Black males to vote, and New Jersey also included unmarried and widowed women, regardless of color. Since married women were not allowed to own property, they could not meet the property qualifications.
Georgia removes property requirement for voting.

1790s
1790
The Naturalization Act of 1790 allows free white persons born outside of the United States to become citizens. However, due to the Constitution granting the states the power to set voting requirements, this Act (and its successor Naturalization Act of 1795) did not automatically grant the right to vote.
1791
Vermont is admitted as a new state, giving the vote to men regardless of color or property ownership.
1792
New Hampshire removes property ownership as requirement to vote.
Kentucky is admitted as a new state, giving the vote to free men regardless of color or property ownership. However, most Blacks in Kentucky may not vote because they are enslaved and after a short time, the vote is taken away also from free Blacks.
Delaware removes property ownership as requirement to vote, continues to impose need to pay taxes to vote.
1798
Georgia removes tax requirement for voting.

19th century

1800s
1807
 Voting rights are taken away from free black males and from all women in New Jersey.

1820s 

 In the 1820 election, there were 108,359 ballots cast. Most older states with property restrictions dropped them by the mid-1820s, except for Rhode Island, Virginia and North Carolina. No new states had property qualifications although three had adopted tax-paying qualifications – Ohio, Louisiana, and Mississippi, of which only in Louisiana were these significant and long lasting.
1821

 In 1821, the state of New York held a constitutional convention which removed property qualifications for white male voters, but introduced  for "persons of colour" a new requirement to own $250 worth of property, "over and above all debts," in order to vote. White male voters were instead required to pay a tax, but this rule was abolished in an amendment of 1826. Requirements for persons of color were not affected by this amendment. Due to the state's policy of gradual emancipation, slavery persisted until 1827, but until then the proportion of African Americans who were free (and thus potential voters) steadily increased. Native Americans still controlled large territories in Upstate New York, and though typically excluded from citizenship altogether, the property requirement applied to any voter who was not white.

1828
The 1828 presidential election was the first in which non-property-holding white males could vote in the vast majority of states. By the end of the 1820s, attitudes and state laws had shifted in favor of universal white male suffrage.
Maryland passes a law to allow Jews to vote. Maryland was the last state to remove religious restrictions for voting.

1830s
1838
 Voting rights are taken away from free black males in Pennsylvania.
Kentucky women are allowed to vote in school elections.

1840s 
1840
 Voter turnout soared during the 1830s, reaching about 80% of adult white male population in the 1840 presidential election. 
1841
The Dorr Rebellion takes place in Rhode Island because men who did not own land could not vote.
1843
Rhode Island drafts a new constitution giving any free man the right to vote.
1848
Mexicans living in US territories are declared citizens in the Treaty of Guadalupe Hidalgo, but are often discouraged from voting.

1850s 
1856
 The last state to abolish property qualification was North Carolina in 1856.

1860s
1860
Tax-paying qualifications remained in five states in 1860 – Massachusetts, Rhode Island, Pennsylvania, Delaware and North Carolina. They survived in Pennsylvania and Rhode Island until the 20th century. In addition, many poor whites were later disenfranchised.
1866
Wisconsin gives African American men the right to vote after Ezekiel Gillespie fights for his right to vote.
1868
 Citizenship is guaranteed to all male persons born or naturalized in the United States by the Fourteenth Amendment to the United States Constitution, setting the stage for future expansions to voting rights.
November 3: The right of African American men to vote in Iowa is approved through a voter referendum.
1869
Women in Wyoming get equal suffrage rights.

1870s
1870
 The Fifteenth Amendment to the United States Constitution prevents states from denying the right to vote on grounds of "race, color, or previous condition of servitude".
Disfranchisement after the Reconstruction era began soon after. Former Confederate states passed Jim Crow laws and amendments to effectively disfranchise African-American and poor white voters through poll taxes, literacy tests, grandfather clauses and other restrictions, applied in a discriminatory manner. During this period, the Supreme Court generally upheld state efforts to discriminate against racial minorities; only later in the 20th century were these laws ruled unconstitutional. Black males in the Northern states could vote, but the majority of African Americans lived in the South.
Women in Utah get the right to vote.
1875
Minor v. Happersett goes to the Supreme Court, where it is decided that suffrage is not a right of citizenship and women do not necessarily have the right to vote.
1876
Native Americans are ruled non-citizens and ineligible to vote by the Supreme Court of the United States.
Virginia amends their state constitution to include paying a poll tax as a requirement to vote.

1880s
1882
 Chinese-Americans lose the right to vote and become citizens through the Chinese Exclusion Act.
Virginia amends their state constitution to eliminate paying the poll tax as a requirement to vote.
1883
Women in Washington Territory earn the right to vote.
1887
Citizenship is granted to Native Americans who are willing to disassociate themselves from their tribe by the Dawes Act, making those males technically eligible to vote.
Women in Washington lose the right to vote.
Women in Utah lose the right to vote under the Edmunds–Tucker Act.
Kansas women earn the right to vote in municipal elections.
Arizona, Montana, New Jersey, North Dakota, and South Dakota grant partial suffrage to women.

1890s 
1890
Native Americans can apply for citizenship through the Indian Naturalization Act.
1893
Colorado passes full women's suffrage.
1896
Women in Utah regain their right to vote.
Grandfather clauses are enacted in Louisiana in order to disenfranchise Black voters.
Women's suffrage is won in Idaho.
1899
The right to vote in the territory of Hawaii is restricted to English and Hawaiian speaking men and the territory is not allowed to make its own suffrage legislation.

20th century

1900s 
1901

 Alabama enacts a cumulative poll tax in their state constitution. This means that all taxes that should have been paid since an eligible voter turned 21 must be paid before voting.

1902

Virginia amends their state constitution to bring back the poll tax as a requirement to vote.

1910s
1910
 Washington state restores women's right to vote through the state constitution.
1911
California women earn the right to vote.
1912
Women in Arizona and Kansas earn the right to vote.
Women in Oregon earn the right to vote.
1913
Direct election of Senators, established by the Seventeenth Amendment to the United States Constitution, gave voters rather than state legislatures the right to elect senators.
White and African American women in the Territory of Alaska earn the right to vote.
Women in Illinois earn the right to vote in presidential elections.
1914
Nevada and Montana women earn the right to vote.
1917
Women in Arkansas earn the right to vote in primary elections.
Women in Rhode Island earn the right to vote in presidential elections.
Women in New York, Oklahoma, and South Dakota earn equal suffrage through their state constitutions.
1918
Women in Texas earn the right to vote in primary elections.
Women in South Dakota earn the right to vote with the passage of the Citizenship Amendment.

1920s
1920
 Women are guaranteed the right to vote by the Nineteenth Amendment to the United States Constitution. In practice, the same restrictions that hindered the ability of non-white men to vote now also applied to non-white women.
1923

 Texas passes a white primary law.

1924
 All Native Americans are granted citizenship and the right to vote through the Indian Citizenship Act, regardless of tribal affiliation. By this point, approximately two thirds of Native Americans were already citizens. Notwithstanding, some western states continued to bar Native Americans from voting until 1948. South Dakota refused to follow the law.
1925
Alaska passes a literacy test designed to disenfranchise Alaska Native voters.
1926

 Georgia passes a cumulative poll tax rule.

1927

 Nixon v. Herndon is heard by the Supreme Court, which rules that white primary laws are unconstitutional.

1930s 
1932

 Nixon v. Condon is heard by the Supreme Court which strikes down a Texas law to allow political parties to choose who can vote in their primary elections.
1933

 Poll taxes are abolished in Pennsylvania.

1935

 Grovey v. Townsend decides that the Democratic Party, as private organization, can determine who is allowed to join and therefore vote in the primaries.
1937

 Breedlove v. Suttles was heard by the Supreme Court which decides that Georgia is allowed to impose a poll tax.

1940s
1943
 Chinese immigrants are given the right to citizenship and the right to vote by the Magnuson Act.
1944

 The decision in Grovey v. Townsend is overturned by the case, Smith v. Allwright heard before the Supreme Court. It is decided that primary elections are an "integral component of the electoral process" and discrimination in participation in the primaries was prohibited.

1948
 Arizona and New Mexico are among the last states to extend full voting rights to Native Americans, which had been opposed by some western states in contravention of the Indian Citizenship Act of 1924.

1950s 
1951

 Butler v. Thompson is heard by the Supreme Court which rules that poll taxes are settled law that the state of Virginia is allowed to impose.
1952
 All Americans with Asian ancestry are allowed to vote through the McCarran Walter Act.
1954
Native Americans living on reservations earn the right to vote in Maine. 
1958

 The provision in the North Dakota state constitution that required Native Americans to renounce their tribal affiliations two years before an election is removed.

1959
Alaska adopts a more lenient literacy test.

1960s
1961
 Residents of Washington, D.C. are granted the right to vote in U.S. Presidential Elections by the Twenty-third Amendment to the United States Constitution.
1962-1964
A historic turning point arrived after the U.S. Supreme Court under Chief Justice Earl Warren made a series of landmark decisions which helped establish the nationwide "one man, one vote" electoral system in the United States.
In March 1962, the Warren Court ruled in Baker v. Carr (1962) that redistricting qualifies as a justiciable question, thus enabling federal courts to hear redistricting cases.
In February 1964, the Warren Court ruled in Wesberry v. Sanders (1964) that districts in the United States House of Representatives must be approximately equal in population. 
In June 1964, the Warren Court ruled in Reynolds v. Sims (1964) that each chamber of a bicameral state legislature must have electoral districts roughly equal in population. 
1964
Poll Tax payment prohibited from being used as a condition for voting in federal elections by the Twenty-fourth Amendment to the United States Constitution.
1965
 Protection of voter registration and voting for racial minorities, later applied to language minorities, is established by the Voting Rights Act of 1965. This has also been applied to correcting discriminatory election systems and districting.
In Harman v. Forssenius the Supreme Court ruled that poll taxes or "equivalent or milder substitutes" cannot be imposed on voters.
1966
 Tax payment and wealth requirements for voting in state elections are prohibited by the Supreme Court in Harper v. Virginia Board of Elections. The poll tax would remain on the books, unenforceable, until 2020.

1970s

1970
 Alaska ends the use of literacy tests.
Native Americans who live on reservations in Colorado are first allowed to vote in the state.
1971
Adults aged 18 through 21 are granted the right to vote by the Twenty-sixth Amendment to the United States Constitution. This was enacted in response to Vietnam War protests, which argued that soldiers who were old enough to fight for their country should be granted the right to vote.
1972
 Requirement that a person reside in a jurisdiction for an extended period is prohibited by the Supreme Court in Dunn v. Blumstein,  (1972).
1973
 Washington, D.C. local elections, such as Mayor and Councilmen, restored after a 100-year gap in Georgetown, and a 190-year gap in the wider city, ending Congress's policy of local election disfranchisement started in 1801 in this former portion of Maryland—see: D.C. Home rule.
1974
A challenge to felony disenfranchisement, Richardson v. Ramirez is filed, though the Supreme Court upholds California's policies.
O'Brien v. Skinner upholds the rights of some people who are incarcerated to vote without interference from the government.
1975
The Voting Rights Act is modified to provide voters information in Native American languages and other non-English languages.

1980s
1982

 A 25-year extension of the VRA is signed by President Ronald Reagan.

1983
 Texas repeals the lifelong prohibition against voters with felony convictions and institutes a five year waiting period after completing a sentence to vote.
1985
Texas changes the five year waiting period to two years for people with felony convictions.
1986
United States Military and Uniformed Services, Merchant Marine, other citizens overseas, living on bases in the United States, abroad, or aboard ship are granted the right to vote by the Uniformed and Overseas Citizens Absentee Voting Act.

1990s 
1993
 The National Voter Registration Act passes and is meant to make voter registration available in more locations.
1997
Texas ends the two year waiting period for people with felony convictions to restore voting rights.
1998
People in Utah with a felony conviction are prohibited from voting while serving their sentence. People with a felony conviction may vote after release from prison, if they were convicted in Utah. If they were convicted out of state, their rights are not restored due to the wording of the law.

21st century

2000s
2000
 Voters in United States territories, including American Samoa, Guam, Puerto Rico, and the United States Virgin Islands are ruled ineligible to vote in presidential elections.
Delaware ends lifetime disenfranchisement for people with felony convictions for most offenses but institutes a five year waiting period.
2001
New Mexico ends lifetime disenfranchisement for people with a felony conviction.
Connecticut restores the rights of people serving felony probation.
2005
Iowa restores the voting rights of felons who completed their prison sentences.
Nebraska ends lifetime disenfranchisement of people with felonies but adds a five-year waiting period.
2006
The Voting Rights Act of 1965 was extended for the fourth time by President George W. Bush, being the second extension of 25 years.
Utah changes wording of their law and restores voting rights to all people who have completed their prison sentence for a felony.
Rhode Island restores voting rights for people serving probation or parole for felonies.
2007
Florida restores voting rights for most non-violent people with felony convictions.
2009
 Washington restores a person's right to vote if they have completed their sentences for a felony conviction.

2010s

2010
 Voting rights in New Jersey are restored to individuals serving probation and parole for felonies.
2011
Florida changes their felony voting rules; felons must wait five years after sentencing and apply for their right to vote again.
Iowa reverses their rule allowing felons who have completed their sentences to vote.
Texas passes one of the most restrictive voter ID laws in the country, but it is blocked by the courts.
2013
Supreme Court ruled in the 5–4 Shelby County v. Holder decision that Section 4(b) of the Voting Rights Act is unconstitutional. Section 4(b) stated that if states or local governments want to change their voting laws, they must appeal to the Attorney General.
Delaware waives the five-year waiting period for voters with a felony conviction.
North Dakota passes House Bill 1332 which was targeted at restricting Native American voters. Any voter without a permanent address is no longer eligible to vote.
2016
California allows prisoners in county jail to vote.
Maryland restores voting rights to felons after they have served their term in prison.
2017
Alabama publishes a list of crimes that can lead to disqualification of the right to vote.
Wyoming restores the voting rights of non-violent felons.
2018
The residential address law in North Dakota is held up by the United States Supreme Court.
Florida voting rights for people with a felony conviction is restored with some additional requirements needed in some cases.
People with a felony conviction in Louisiana who have not been incarcerated for five years (inclusive of probation or parole) are able to vote.
New York allows parolees to vote.
2019
People convicted of a felony may vote in Nevada after release from prison.
Citizens on parole may vote in Colorado.
People convicted of a felony may vote in Oklahoma after serving their full sentence, including parole and other types of probation.

2020s 
2020
 California restores voting rights to citizens serving parole.
Washington, D.C. passes a law to allow incarcerated felons to vote.
People with a felony conviction have their right to vote in Iowa restored with some restrictions and each potential voter must have completed their sentence.
People with a felony conviction in New Jersey can vote after release from prison; citizens on parole or probation can also vote.
North Dakota reaches an agreement with the Spirit Lake Nation and the Standing Rock Sioux to recognize tribal address as valid for voting purposes.

2021
 The Supreme Court's ruling on Brnovich v. Democratic National Committee has broad removals on the remaining sections of the Voting Rights Act.
 Texas enacts sweeping legislation that further tightens state election laws and constrains local control of elections by limiting counties’ ability to expand voting options.

See also 

 Ballot access
 Civil Rights Act of 1960
Felony disenfranchisement in the United States
 List of suffragists and suffragettes
 Lodge Bill
 Timeline of women's suffrage in the United States
Women's poll tax repeal movement

References

Sources

External links 
 U.S. Voting Rights Infoplease
 U.S. Voting Rights Timeline Northern California Citizenship Project

History of African-American civil rights
Constitutional law
History of voting rights in the United States
United States nationality law
voting rights in the United States
Voting in the United States